Orchards is an Arts and Crafts style house in Bramley in Surrey, England. Described by English Heritage as the first major work of architect Edwin Lutyens, it is a Grade I listed building. The gardens are Grade II* listed in the National Register of Historic Parks and Gardens. The property is privately owned.

House

The house was built during 1897–99 by Lutyens for William and Julia Chance. Sir William Chance (2 July 1853 – 9 April 1935), a barrister and philanthropist, was the son of Sir James Timmins Chance, of the glassmaking company Chance Brothers, and succeeded his father as the second Chance baronet in 1902. His wife, born Julia Charlotte Strachey, was the only child of explorer Sir Henry Strachey. She was an amateur sculptor, and a supporter of the Arts and Crafts movement.

The couple initially commissioned architect Halsey Ricardo for their new house, but did not like his initial designs. When they happened to walk past Munstead Wood, the house which Lutyens was then building for garden designer Gertrude Jekyll, they were impressed and decided to employ Lutyens instead. They also employed the same local firm of builders as Jekyll used at Munstead Wood, Thomas and William Underwood.

Orchards was the first in a series of successful designs by Lutyens for Arts and Crafts style country houses, larger than Munstead Wood but similarly using local styles of vernacular architecture. These included Goddards and Tigbourne Court in Surrey, Deanery Garden in Berkshire and Little Thakeham in Sussex. This series of designs established Lutyens's reputation.

The celebrated approach towards and into Orchards from the north passes alongside a massive, buttressed stable wing on the left, then progresses via a two-storey rectangular opening in the northern side of a quadrangle, towards an entrance porch on its far side. In the north-west corner, next to the opening, Lutyens provided Julia Chance with a two-storey, north-lit studio; this was connected via an arcade along the west side of the quadrangle to her husband's study in the south-west corner. In the south-east corner, the dining room has an east-facing loggia, giving an extensive view over a sunken Dutch garden and the Thorncombe Valley beyond; Lutyens re-used this kind of arrangement at other houses, such as at Marshcourt in Hampshire.

The house is built in Bargate stone, with bands of red tiles, silvered oak timbers and red tile roofs. Internal features include a blue and white tiled fireplace by Julia Chance, painted with a plan of the house, and in her studio a two-storey fireplace. Alterations to the house in 1939 removed some original features.

In 1917, the couple employed Lutyens again, to restore Legh Manor, a 16th-century house in Ansty and Staplefield, West Sussex, and in the following year they commissioned Jekyll to provide a garden design for it.

Gardens

The gardens at Orchards were planted by Gertrude Jekyll.

The Dutch garden has a basin feature with a water spout in the form of a lion mask, by Julia Chance, Grade II listed. She subsequently created sculptures for other Lutyens/Jekyll gardens, including at Marshcourt, and remained a particularly close friend of Gertrude Jekyll.

Notes

References

External links

Grade II* listed parks and gardens in Surrey
Gardens by Gertrude Jekyll
Arts and Crafts architecture in England
Grade I listed buildings in Surrey
Grade I listed houses
Country houses in Surrey
Houses completed in 1899
Works of Edwin Lutyens in England